Yelena Petrovna Antonova (born 21 August 1952) is a rower from  the Soviet Union.

She competed for the Soviet Union in the 1976 Summer Olympics held in Montreal, Canada in the single sculls event where she finished in third place.

References

External links
 

1952 births
Russian female rowers
Soviet female rowers
Olympic rowers of the Soviet Union
Olympic bronze medalists for the Soviet Union
Rowers at the 1976 Summer Olympics
Living people
Olympic medalists in rowing
World Rowing Championships medalists for the Soviet Union
Medalists at the 1976 Summer Olympics
European Rowing Championships medalists